Extreme-G 2, also known as Extreme G: XG2, is a racing video game developed by Probe Entertainment and published by Acclaim Entertainment for Nintendo 64 and Microsoft Windows. It is the sequel to Extreme-G and is followed by Extreme-G 3.

Gameplay

This iteration, as with all Extreme-G games, is about futuristic racing: pilots race plasma-powered Tron-like bikes in an intergalactic Grand Prix at speeds that are over 999 mph. Each of the machines have their own handling characteristics, with varying top speeds, armor values and traction values. All of the machines in the game have an energy meter—with two separate energy stores for protective shields and a basic primary weapon. If a machine loses all of its shield energy, it will explode on contact, causing the player to lose a life or the match.  It is also possible for players to fall off the tracks when driving through jumps or similar obstacles. In this case, the player is simply teleported back to the track. Players are given three "Nitro" boosts per race. Extreme-G has a championship mode ranging from novice to expert, shoot-em-up mode (named "Arcade Mode" in XG2), multiplayer racing, and deathmatch. In shoot-em-up/arcade mode, computer drones follow a lunar path while the player attempts to destroy them with Extreme-G's arsenal of weapons.

Reception

The game received "mixed" reviews on both platforms according to the review aggregation website GameRankings. N64 Magazine editor Jes Bickham felt that Extreme-G 2 was better than its predecessor, but worse than F-Zero X and Wipeout 64. IGN criticised the gameplay, stating that the N64 version was "nowhere near its competition" despite improved controls and tracks. The graphics were criticised for its stuttering framerates and over-filtering.

The Nintendo 64 version was a finalist for the Academy of Interactive Arts & Sciences' 1998 "Racing Game of the Year" award, which went to Gran Turismo.

References

External links
 

1998 video games
Acclaim Entertainment games
Nintendo 64 games
Science fiction racing games
Vehicular combat games
Video games developed in the United Kingdom
Windows games